Ogui is an autonomous community in Nike, in Enugu North Local Government Area of Enugu State in the southeastern geopolitical zone of Nigeria. It comprises Umunevo Village, Ihewuzi Village and Onuato Village. Ogui Nike, as it is usually called, is a major landlord to the administrative, political and economic hub of Enugu City, in that major public and private institutions, shopping malls, hotels, banks and so on are situated on Ogui land.

Notable people

Some notable people in Ogui Nike are
 Hon. Gabriel Agbo, former member House of Representatives (representing Enugu North and South Constituencies).
Hon. Barrister Emeka Nnamani, former member House of Assembly Enugu State and former transition Chairman Enugu North LGA.
 Hon. Philip Nnamani, former member House of Assembly Enugu State.
 Hon. Chuka Ayogu, former Commissioner for Science & Technology Enugu State. 
 Hon. Mrs. Patricia Alum, former Commissioner for Science & Technology Enugu State.
 Hon. Dr. Sam Ngwu, former Commissioner for Health Enugu State.
Hon. Barr. Emeka Geoffrey Ede, former Commissioner for Agriculture under the Executive Governor of Enugu State, Rt. Hon. Ifeanyi Ugwuanyi (Gburugburu). Emeka Ede is the founder of Rhoda African Youth Global Initiative( a non governmental organisation). Currently he is a member(representing Enugu East Zone)of the Governing Board of the Enugu State Agency for Universal Health Coverage (ENSA-UHC) inaugurated by His Excellency Gov. Ifeanyi Ugwuanyi. Hon. Barr. Emeka Ede is also a former Electoral Commissioner. A former Deputy Chairman of Enugu North LGA and a former elected Executive Chairman of Enugu North LGA. He has also served as a Party National Delegate of the PDP( Peoples Democratic Party).
 Hon. Friday Okeke Ugwu, former transition Chairman Enugu North LGA.
 Hon. Chief Emma Ngwu, former transition Chairman Enugu North LGA and former elected Executive Chairman Enugu North LGA.
 Hon. Ejike Ugwu, former transition Chairman Enugu North LGA.
Hon. Emeka Onunze, the elected Executive Chairman of Enugu North LGA under His Excellency Rt. Hon. Ifeanyi Ugwuanyi the Executive Governor of Enugu State.

Culture

The culture of the Ogui people is equivalent to that of neighbouring communities. Major ceremonies and festivals include 
 New yam Festival 
 Masquerade Festival
 Igede( Funeral Rituals)
 Igwe Coronation Ceremony/festival
 Traditional Marriage Ceremonies 
 End of the year meetings/feast.

Government

Ogui practices the monarchical system of government where there is an Igwe who rules over the community, followed by elders and chiefs as well as other titled individuals and groups.  In Ogui, governance takes root from the family extending into lineages, the villages and the general assembly. In the general assembly, the Igwe and the elders and chiefs occupy the hierarchy in the community leadership and followed by other groups responsible for enforcement of community laws. Notable groups include Ogui Town Union, Otu Ugobueze (women's group), Otu Ogbo (age groups), etc.

Infrastructure

Ogui has a functional road system, adequate sources of water and street lights. There are well equipped and functional Health Centres. Notable amongst them are Asata Health Centre and Ogui Nike Health Centre.  Located in the heart of the town is the Afia Nine Square used as a venue for ceremonies, recreational and festival activities.

Economy

The growth of the Ogui economy is facilitated by its people who have various livelihoods that cut across both formal and informal occupations. The economy is also enhanced by the presence of a number of public and private entities situated in Ogui.

Notable places and institutions

Michael Okpara Square, official venue for government functions, recreational activities as well as social and cultural activities.
 Enugu State Government House, otherwise known as the Lion Building.
 Enugu State House of Assembly 
 Enugu North Local Government Council
 Federal Government Secretatiat
 UNICEF Field Office
 Enugu State High Court
 Enugu State Court of Appeal
 Federal High Court
 National Stadium
 National Museum of Unity
 Enugu International Trade Fair Complex
 NYSC Federal Government Office
 Zonal Headquarters of the Nigerian Television Authority.
 Federal Road Corporation of Nigeria. South East Headquarters.
 Federal Character Commission Enugu
 Federal Ministry of Employment, Labour and  Productivity.
 Federal Ministry of Agriculture and Rural Development
 Federal Ministry of Health
 Federal Ministry of Environment
 Department of State Security (DSS) Enugu Headquarters.
 National Archives of Nigeria
 Nigerian Export Promotion Council South East Regional Office
 * Nigeria Deposit Insurance Corporation (NDIC) Zonal Office.
 Nigerian Security and Civil Defence Corps Federal Government Office. 
 Central Bank of Nigeria
 Bank of Industry Enugu Regional Office 
 Economic and Financial Crimes Commission (EFCC)  Enugu State Zonal Office.
 Enugu International Conference Centre
 West African Examinations Council( WAEC). Enugu Zonal Office.
 Shoprite Mall
 SPAR Shopping Mall
 Parklane Specialist Hospital Enugu
 National Orthopaedic Hospital 
 Federal Government College Enugu
 University of Nigeria Nsukka Enugu Campus Branch
 Institute of Management and Technology (IMT) Enugu Campus 
 Enugu State University of Science and Technology (ESUT).
 ESUT Business School 
 Nigeria Prison Enugu

Market places

Ogui is the home of the biggest market in Enugu State, the Ogbete Main Market. New Haven Market, Old Artisan Market, New Artisan Market, New Market, Afia Nine Market are also in Ogui.

Places of worship

 Christ Ascension Church Ogui
 St. Luke Anglican Church Ogui
 St. Faith Anglican Church 
 Ebenezer Anglican Church 
 Church of Transfiguration of our Lord Ihewuzi
 Holy Ghost Cathedral 
 All Saints Anglican Church 
 Dunamis International Gospel Centre  etc.

References

Enugu